Għajnsielem, meaning "Peaceful Spring", is a municipality on the southeastern coast of the island of Gozo in Malta, including the entire island of Comino. It has a population of 3,200 residents (as of March 2014), and is the first Gozitan village that greets the visitor on leaving Mġarr Harbour towards the Gozitan heartland. Its name originated from the water spring, around which in 1700, Grandmaster Perellos built an arcade containing public wash basins and fresh water spouts. Attractions include Lourdes Chapel with its sharp steeple and underlying niche of Our Lady of Lourdes, Fort Chambray and the towering of Ghajnsielem Parish Church.

Village Motto and Coat of Arms
The Latin motto of Ghajnsielem is Ob fontem prosperitas, that is Flourishing because of a spring – Nistaghna b’nixxiegha ilma. The springs in the area were the magnet that attracted the first inhabitants that eventually led to the prosperity of the place.

Places

The following is a list of prominent places, buildings and structures in the village.

Mġarr Harbour
Fort Chambray
Lourdes Chapel and Lourdes Home
Our Lady of Loreto Parish Church
Apparation Square
St Anthony's Church
Mġarr ix-Xini Tower
Comino
Old Parish Church
Imrejżbiet and Tal-Qiegħan Temples
Santa Cecilia Tower and Chapel
Niches around Ghajnsielem
Borġ Għarib
The Fougasse
Garzes Tower (demolished)
Belvederes
Gozo Heritage (closed)
Xatt l-Aħmar

Band Clubs
St. Joseph Band Club (L-Għaqda Mużikali San Ġużepp)

Football Clubs
Għajnsielem F.C.

Zones in Għajnsielem
Borġ l-Għarib
Fort Chambray
Ġnien Miġiaro
Iċ-Ċens
Il-Gudja
Mġarr Port
Mġarr Valley
Imrejżbiet
Rdum it-Tafal
Ta' Briegħen
Ta' Cordina
Ta' Kusbejja
Taħt il-Belt
Tal-Palma
Xatt l-Aħmar
Żewwieqa

Għajnsielem Main Roads
Pjazza Indipendenza (Independence Square)
Pjazza Loreto (Loreto Square)
Triq Borġ Għarib (Borg Gharib Road)
Triq il-Fawwara
Triq il-Ġnien (Garden Street)
Triq il-Ħamri
Triq il-Qala (Qala Road)
Triq in-Nadur (Nadur Road)
Triq ix-Xatt (Strand Street)
Triq iż-Żewwieqa
Triq l-Imġarr (Mġarr Road)
Triq Sant' Antnin (St Anthony Road)

Twin towns – sister cities

Għajnsielem is twinned with:
 Bethlehem, Palestine
 Tolfa, Italy
 Portet-sur-Garonne, France

See also
Radju Lauretana

References

External links

Għajnsielem Local Council
ghajnsielem.com
Radju Lauretana

 
Towns in Malta
Local councils of Malta
Gozo